Yenimahalle is a metropolitan district of Ankara Province in the Central Anatolia region of Turkey, a fast-growing urban residential district of the city of Ankara, Turkey's capital. According to 2010 census, population of the urban center is 648,160.

Yenimahalle today

The name Yenimahalle means the new quarter and in the late 1940s the area of open land to the west of the city was allocated for civil servants and workers housing. This grew with the construction of the E5 highway through the area and even more when the metro was built. Today the district mainly consists of large estates of apartment buildings and although the area is being filled up with concrete buildings there is still green space, tennis courts and other sports areas. There is some illegal building at the edge of the district but Yenimahalle is mainly planned development. This is the home for both of Ankara's teams: Gençlerbirliği and Ankaragücü, although their shared stadium is in Altındağ.

82% of the working population are civil servants or workers in the city of Ankara. There is also a large retired community, and a small but growing number of traders and shopkeepers. Ankara's largest industrial area, OSTIM Industrial Zone, is on the edge of the district too. The rural areas are used mainly for growing grains and pulses.

The headquarters of the national intelligence service Millî İstihbarat Teşkilâtı is in Yenimahalle.

Demographics

Neighbourhoods 

There are 56 neighbourhoods in Yenimahalle as of 2017.

Places of interest
 Akköprü, a bridge over the Ankara River, built by the Seljuk Turks in 1222, on the old trade route to Baghdad.
 Atatürk Forest Farm and Zoo, park and farm, financed by Mustafa Kemal Atatürk (1881-1938) personally to provide a place of recreation and agriculture in the city. It contains the Ankara Zoo and a full-size replica of the house in Salonica (today in Greece), where Atatürk was born.
 Ankara 75th Anniversary Race Course, horse racetrack

Notes

References

External links
 District governor's official website 
 District municipality's official website 

Populated places in Ankara Province
Districts of Ankara Province